Wellston is a city in St. Louis County, Missouri, United States, along the northwest border of the city of St. Louis. The population was 2,313 at the 2010 census.

History

Wellston was incorporated as a city in 1909; due to "government difficulties" the city was dissolved three years later, only to be reestablished in 1949. The city was named for Erastus Wells.

During the early 1900s, the Wagner Electric Company, a manufacturer of small motors for appliances and transformers, began development along Plymouth Avenue in Wellston, growing to occupy the entire block and providing 4,500 jobs during World War I. North of the Wagner site, ABEX Corporation built a steel foundry that began operation in 1923.

In 1982 ABEX moved out of its Wellston location; the next year, the Wagner Electric Company closed its doors.  After closure, it took 22 years, and millions of dollars in tax credits and development grants, for the St. Louis County Economic Council to demolish five buildings and clean up  of the Wagner brownfield land along the MetroLink so that it could be made marketable as the Plymouth Industrial Park.

Geography
Wellston is located at  (38.672851, -90.292237).

Transportation
Wellston has a few major roads within its boundaries, including Missouri Route 180, Missouri Route 340, and SR-D.

Wellston station is the main St. Louis MetroLink station for Wellston, featuring 243 park and ride spaces.  It is located at 6402 Plymouth Avenue and serves an average of 1,569 passengers daily.  Rock Road station is a MetroLink station on the edge of Wellston, featuring 183 park and ride spaces and averaging 2,408 passengers daily.  Rock Road Station is located at 7019 St. Charles Rock Road, a major connecting highway between St. Louis City and northwest St. Louis County.

Education
Public education is provided by the Normandy Schools Collaborative.

Demographics

Wellston is one of the 10 poorest cities in Missouri.

2010 census
As of the census of 2010, there were 2,313 people, 785 households, and 540 families living in the city. The racial makeup of the city was 2.4% White, 95.4% African American, 0.1% Native American, 0.2% Asian, 0.1% from other races, and 1.7% from two or more races. Hispanic or Latino of any race were 0.4% of the population.

There were 785 households, of which 47.8% had children under the age of 18 living with them, 14.6% were married couples living together, 47.5% had a female householder with no husband present, 6.6% had a male householder with no wife present, and 31.2% were non-families. 27.1% of all households were made up of individuals, and 9.1% had someone living alone who was 65 years of age or older. The average household size was 2.95 and the average family size was 3.62.

The median age in the city was 26.2 years. 37% of residents were under the age of 18; 11.4% were between the ages of 18 and 24; 23.6% were from 25 to 44; 19.6% were from 45 to 64; and 8.4% were 65 years of age or older. The gender makeup of the city was 44.9% male and 55.1% female.

2000 census
As of the census of 2000, there were 2,460 people, 779 households, and 578 families living in the city. The racial makeup of the city was 92.07% African American, 6.30% White, 0.45% Native American, 0.16% Asian, 0.04% Pacific Islander, 0.37% from other races, and 0.61% from two or more races. Hispanic or Latino of any race were 1.06% of the population.

There were 779 households, out of which 36.6% had children under the age of 18 living with them, 22.3% were married couples living together, 44.9% had a female householder with no husband present, and 25.7% were non-families. 23.6% of all households were made up of individuals, and 9.5% had someone living alone who was 65 years of age or older. The average household size was 3.08 and the average family size was 3.64.

In the city the population was spread out, with 35.7% under the age of 18, 12.4% from 18 to 24, 23.8% from 25 to 44, 17.6% from 45 to 64, and 10.5% who were 65 years of age or older. The median age was 27 years. For every 100 females, there were 82.8 males. For every 100 females age 18 and over, there were 75.3 males.

The median income for a household in the city was $18,596, and the median income for a family was $20,625. Males had a median income of $21,264 versus $18,917 for females. The per capita income for the city was $6,262. About 59.2% of families and 68.1% of the population were below the poverty line, including 70.1% of those under age 18 and 78.6% of those age 65 or over.

Notable people 
Ben McLemore (born 1993), NBA player

References

Cities in St. Louis County, Missouri
Cities in Missouri